Arsinoe was a city on the coast of ancient Cilicia between Anemurium and Kelenderis; the site is near the modern city of Bozyazı, Mersin Province, Turkey.  Strabo mentions Arsinoe as having a port. In the 19th century, William Martin Leake placed it at or near the ruined modern castle, called Softa Kalesi (Sokhta Kálesi), just west of Bozyazı, below which is a port, such as Strabo describes at Arsinoe, and a peninsula on the east side of the harbor covered with ruins. This modern site is east of Anemurium, and west of, and near to, Kızil Burnu (Cape Kizliman). The city was founded by Ptolemy Philadelphus and named for Arsinoe II of Egypt, his sister and wife.

References

Populated coastal places in Turkey
Ruins in Turkey
Ptolemaic colonies
Populated places in ancient Cilicia
Former populated places in Cilicia
History of Mersin Province